ARA Nueve de Julio (C-5) was an Argentine Navy cruiser, purchased from the United States Navy on 11 January 1951. Nueve de Julio was decommissioned in 1978 and sent to Japan to be scrapped.

Early career 

Boise was a  light cruiser, named for the city of Boise, the capital of Idaho. She served in World War II in the Pacific theater before decommissioning on 11 July 1946.

Argentine career 
Boise was sold to the Argentine Navy on 11 January 1951. During her service in the Argentine Navy, she participated in the 1955 Revolución Libertadora, when she shelled oil depots and military facilities in the city of Mar del Plata, along with a flotilla of destroyers, on 19 September 1955. She was accidentally rammed by her sister  (former ) during an exercise on 15 March 1956, which resulted in damage to both cruisers. Nueve de Julio was withdrawn from active service in May 1971 and spent her last years moored at the Puerto Belgrano Naval Base. By the mid 1970s, the rat-infested vessel was in a state of decay and abandonment.

From March 1976 and until at least December of that year she was set up as a clandestine detention center. A number of cabins were converted into cells in which disappeared persons were temporarily held for periods ranging from days to months, while torture sessions took place at the headquarters of the Naval Establishments Police. At least one baby was born in captivity inside the ship, its fate remaining a mystery.

Nueve de Julio was struck on 31 October 1977 and sold on 28 June 1981, with the manifesto stating that she was to be moored at Brownsville, Texas and converted into a museum ship. Instead, she was towed to Japan and scrapped for metal there in 1983. General Belgrano remained in service until her sinking during the Falklands War by the British submarine .

See also 
 List of cruisers
 List of ships of the Argentine Navy

Citations

External links 
 ARA history, official website. 
 Ships of the ARA 
 History of the "ARA Nueve de Julio (C-5) 
 history.navy.mil: Official Photos of USS Boise 
 navsource.org: USS Boise

Brooklyn-class cruisers of the Argentine Navy
Ships built in Newport News, Virginia
1936 ships
Cold War cruisers of Argentina
Maritime incidents in 1955
Maritime incidents in 1956
Maritime incidents in Argentina

de:ARA Nueve de Julio